The Sarda or Suino Sardo is a breed of domestic pig from  the Mediterranean island of Sardinia, Italy. It is raised mainly in the provinces of Ogliastra and Nuoro, but is also present in those of Medio Campidano and Sassari and in the Sarrabus-Gerrei sub-region. The Sarda breed was officially recognised by ministerial decree on 8 June 2006 and became the sixth autochthonous pig breed recognised by the Ministero delle Politiche Agricole Alimentari e Forestali, the Italian ministry of agriculture and forestry.

History
The earliest detailed description of Sardinian pigs was written by Francesco Cetti in 1774, in his :

Both the description and the accompanying illustration are comparable to present-day Sarda pigs and to the modern breed standard.

Management of the Sarda pig is almost always completely open-range; the pigs are allowed to range freely in wooded mountain areas, often including public land, where they feed on acorns, chestnuts and roots. Additional feed is given only in the summer, when natural sources of food are scarce. Pigmen train the pigs to come at their call to the usual feeding-place; feed is often given directly on the ground, or at the side of the road.

At the end of 2012 there were 575 pigs registered.

References

Pig breeds originating in Italy
Italian products with protected designation of origin